Deveikiškiai (formerly) is a village in Kėdainiai district municipality, in Kaunas County, in central Lithuania. According to the 2011 census, the village had a population of 35 people.

History
At the 16th century the village was known as Deveikiai and had 20 voloks of agriculture land. In 1912 part of the village was split into solitary homesteads (Deveikiškėliai village).

Demography

Images

References

Villages in Kaunas County
Kėdainiai District Municipality